Andrew Curtain (born 1967) is a former New Zealand international lawn bowls player.

Bowls career
Curtain won two medals at the 1996 World Outdoor Bowls Championship; a silver in the triples and a bronze in the fours.

He won the gold medal with Rowan Brassey and Peter Belliss in the men's triples at the 2000 World Outdoor Bowls Championship in Johannesburg.

Curtain also represented New Zealand at the 2002 Commonwealth Games.

He won five medals at the Asia Pacific Bowls Championships of which four were gold.

He won the 1997 & 2008 pairs title and the 1993, 1994, 1996, 1997 & 2004 fours title at the New Zealand National Bowls Championships when bowling for the various bowls clubs.

References

External links
 

1967 births
Living people
New Zealand male bowls players
Bowls World Champions
Bowls players at the 2002 Commonwealth Games
Commonwealth Games competitors for New Zealand